Mariano Sánchez (born 3 July 1978) is a former professional tennis player from Mexico.

Biography
Sánchez, a right-handed player from Cuernavaca, turned professional in 1996. He competed mostly on the Challenger circuit, where he won two doubles titles, but twice appeared in the Mexican Open, a tournament on the ATP Tour. On both occasions he did well, he was a finalist in 1997 with Luis Herrera, then in 1998 made the semi-finals with Leonardo Lavalle.

In Davis Cup competition, Sánchez played in three ties for Mexico. He featured in Mexico's Americas Zone relegation play-off ties against Bahamas and Colombia. In each of the ties he won reverse singles matches, both were in dead rubbers, with Mexico having already lost. His other tie was in the 2000 Davis Cup against Venezuela, in the Americas Zone Group II final. Mexico won the tie 5–0 to secure promotion to Group I, with Sánchez winning both of his singles matches.

ATP Tour career finals

Doubles: 1 (0–1)

Challenger titles

Doubles: (2)

See also
List of Mexico Davis Cup team representatives

References

External links
 
 
 

1978 births
Living people
Mexican male tennis players
Sportspeople from Cuernavaca